Aagot Vinterbo-Hohr (born 2 December 1936) is a Norwegian Sami physician and writer, born in Måsøy. She made her literary début in 1987 with the text collection Palimpsest, for which she was awarded the Tarjei Vesaas' debutantpris. She published the poetry collection Kjærlighetsfuge in 1991.

References

1936 births
20th-century Norwegian poets
Living people
Norwegian women poets
20th-century Norwegian women writers
People from Måsøy